<onlyinclude>
Erotic spanking is the act of spanking another person for the sexual arousal or gratification of either or both parties. The intensity of the act can vary in both its duration and severity, and may include the use of one or more spanking implements (such as the wooden spoon or cane). Activities range from a spontaneous smack on bare buttocks during sexual activity to sexual roleplaying, such as ageplay or domestic discipline. Erotic spanking is often found within and associated with BDSM, however the activity is not exclusive to it. The term spankee is commonly used within erotic spanking to refer to the individual receiving a spanking.

History

Pre 19th century 
One of the earliest depictions of erotic spanking is found in the Etruscan Tomb of the Whipping from the fifth century BC.

Early sex manuals such as the Indian Kama Sutra (circa 400 BC), Indian Koka Shastra (ca. 1150 AD) and Arabic The Perfumed Garden (ca. 1400 AD) have among their recommendations the use of spanking to enhance sexual arousal.

19th century 
Interest in sexual gratification received from giving, receiving and witnessing spanking began to increase during the 19th century (particularly within France and the United Kingdom). Interest was not only confined to spanking literature, but the development of photography during 19th century resulted in the beginning of the creation of spanking photography. In the context of literature, this growing demand caused the publication of numerous limited edition spanking novels (although, while the term novel is/was used many of these works from this time and subsequently can be instead classified as novellas).

20th century

Early 20th century 

This interest for spanking (both in regards to literature and photography) followed into the next century, with the early 20th century being considered the "Golden Age" of spanking literature. This period of spanking literature is marked by three notable characteristics. First, greater audiences were reached with the availability of less expensive editions and greater print runs. Second, many of the spanking novels contained numerous illustrations (many of which have fallen under public domain and are easily available online). Third, this period saw a gradual increase in the output and publication of spanking literature, growing particularly within the 1920s and peaking within the 1930s. Much of the output of spanking literature during this period was by French publishers, writers and illustrators. Similarly, within the context of spanking photography, France was also the home to the creation of much content, with the most notable studios being the Biederer Studio and the Ostra Studio. This "Golden Age" of spanking literature (and French spanking photography) came to an end as a result of the Second World War, more specifically due to the German occupation of France between 1940 and 1944 and later the enforcement of censorship laws. A somewhat notable exception to the decline of spanking literature during this period was John Willie's bondage Bizarre magazine (published between 1946 and 1959).

Of the many French works from the "Golden Age" few at the time were translated into other languages within which spanking literature was popular, namely English and German, but beginning during the mid-1960s a number of these French works were translated into English and published, along with these works being republished in French and older British works also being republished. The occurrence of this was facilitated by the availability of mass-produced paperbacks and changes in censorship laws.

Late 20th century 
During the latter half of the 20th century changes in both censorship laws and improvements within technology enabled greater accessibility for those interested in obtaining content related to erotic spanking.

As an extension of the earlier developments within spanking literature and photography, during this period various fetish magazines devoted to stories and imagery of erotic spanking became legally available.

This period also saw an important development in both the production and consumer accessibility of erotic spanking films. Whilst recordings of erotic spanking had been produced as early as the 1920s, until the 1980s technology limited the quality of their recording and the ability for consumers to easily watch them. In addition to changes in censorship laws, the introduction of the videocassette recorder enabled creators to produce and distribute erotic spanking films that were far easier for consumers to both obtain and watch.

21st century 
The proliferation of the internet has enabled individuals, of various level of pre-existing interest and/or knowledge, more ease then ever to explore and consume content relating to erotic spanking.

Partially developing from earlier erotic spanking magazine and video producers, numerous pornographic websites (primary American or British based) within the 21st century are devoted to producing spanking films of various lengths and about various scenarios.

The internet has also resulted in the creation of various blogs which discuss the topic of erotic spanking and non-profit websites which publish erotic spanking stories.

Practice

Implements 
Whilst a spanking may be simply given with the palm of the hand, the use of spanking implements is common within erotic spanking. Spanking implements which are commonly used within erotic spanking are a reflection of the traditional spanking implements that were/are used in corporal punishment more broadly. Common and traditional spanking implements include those which have been specifically manufactured for such purpose (i.e. the cane, paddle, strap, tawse and martinet) and those which have been adapted/improvised from available items (such as the slipper, wooden spoon, hairbrush, carpet beater, riding crop, switch and birch). Other less common and atypical spanking implements include the (handle of a) feather duster (common, however, in China), fly swatter and stinging nettles.

Some spanking implements can be characterised as being either 'stingy' or 'thuddy'. Stingy implements (such as a cane) produce a sharp and quick burning sensation which is mostly felt on the skin. Thuddy implements (such as a paddle), in contrast, whilst not producing a stinging sensation penetrate deeper into tissue of the buttocks. As a general rule, the heavier a spanking implement is the greater thud it will produce. A person receiving an erotic spanking may have a preference for either a stingy or thuddy sensation.

Safety 
For safety, during a spanking, particularly with spanking implements, care should be taken to avoid striking the tailbone and hipbones.

Apparatuses 
Erotic spanking can include the use of apparatuses, both those which are adapted/improvised and those which are specifically created for such use.

The use of adapted/improvised apparatuses within erotic spanking derives from how such apparatuses were used in non-erotic spanking. The gymnastic vaulting-buck (which sees the receiver of the spanking bent-over it) was often employed during non-erotic school slipperings and canings; consequently erotic spanking, particularly that which involves school roleplay, may incorporate use of a vaulting-buck.

A spanking bench or spanking horse is a piece of erotic furniture explicitly created for erotic spanking. It is used to position a spankee on, with or without restraints. They come in many sizes and styles, the most popular design of which is similar to a sawhorse (used in woodworking) with a padded top and rings for restraints. The 19th-century British dominatrix Mrs. Theresa Berkley became famous for her invention of the Berkley Horse, a similar form of BDSM apparatus.

Fetish wear 
Often erotic spanking will be combined with sexual roleplay which may see one or more party dress-up in certain clothing, for example a female spankee wearing a schoolgirl uniform in a Teacher – Student scenario.

A spank skirt or spanking skirt is a skirt that has an additional opening in back designed to expose the buttocks. While the name spank skirt suggests the intention that the wearer be spanked "bare bottom" without removing or repositioning the skirt, this item may be worn for reasons other than spanking (for instance, exposure). Considered fetish wear, these kind of skirts are typically tight-fitting and made of fetishistic materials (such as leather, PVC or latex). Regardless of the gender of the wearer, spank skirts are usually considered female attire. The male gender role equivalent might be motorcycle chaps (a.k.a. "assless chaps").

Self-spanking 

Self-spanking is the practice in which the individual spanks themselves, thus making the spankee and the spanker one and the same. This can occur for a number of reasons: the individual is experimenting with spanking; the individual may lack someone (who is willing and the spankee is comfortable with doing so) to give them a spanking; the individual spank themselves during masturbation; the individual is a submissive in a BDSM relationship and is self-spanking on orders of the dominant partner.

Psychology and prevalence 
A number of explanations have been put forward to account why an individual may enjoy erotic spanking, although there is almost certainly no universal explanation. Interest and gratification in spanking varies per the individual: an individual may gain gratification in spanking another and gain no gratification in being spanked themself; an individual may gain gratification in being spanked and gain no gratification in spanking another; an individual may gain gratification in both spanking another and being spanked themself.

A scientific survey of 152 people who claimed to practice sadomasochism - of which spanking is a subset - categorised the origin of such interest to be either extrinsic (i.e. the interest originating from a source external to the person) or intrinsic (i.e. emerged naturally). 22% of those surveyed reported origins that were categorised by researchers as extrinsic, such as parental discipline or being introduced to sadomasochism in adulthood by another. In contrast, 78% reported intrinsically having such an interest. Most commonly an intrinsic interest was reported to have emerged in either childhood or adolescence (though at such age the interest was not necessarily sexualised); a small sub-group reported that only in adulthood did they accept or acknowledge what they now recognise to be an intrinsic interest. The majority of those that reported an intrinsic interest were unable to explain the origin of such interest.

From the same scientific survey as above, a third of testimonies reported enjoying receiving pain as to why they practiced sadomasochism; researchers noted that practitioners commonly stressed the difference between "bad" and "good" pain. Interpersonal power (either through giving or exchanging power) was also a commonly reported reason as to why people practice sadomasochism, and researchers noted that this taking place with a trusted partner was a recurring specified need.

Journalist Jillian Keenan has argued that spanking fetishism is a form of sexual orientation, which should not be considered a mental illness. Whilst there has been an increasing ability to talk openly about erotic spanking within mainstream society, individuals may still find it difficult to express that they have an interest in erotic spanking.

See also 

 Algolagnia
 BDSM
 Christian domestic discipline
 Dominatrix
 Impact play
 Male dominance
 Sadism and masochism in fiction

References 
Notes

Further reading
 Koetzle, Michael. 1000 Nudes: A History of Erotic Photography from 1839-1939. Taschen, 2005.
 Lady Green, The Compleat Spanker. Greenery Press, 2000. .
 Marcus, Steven. The Other Victorians. Basic Books, 1966.
 Swinburne, Charles Algernon. The Works of Charles Algernon Swinburne. Hertfordshire: Wordsworth Editions, 1995.

External links 

 The Spanking Art Wiki – relaunched
 Biblio Curiosa Wiki (Italian)
 Basics of Erotic Spanking
 Spanking Consent

BDSM
Paraphilias
Sexual acts
Spanking